Arslanbek Sultanbekov (born April 23, 1965), is a Nogai folk musician and poet, a dombra player of the Turkic world.

Biography 
Arslanbek Sultanbekov was born April 23, 1965, in the aul Erkin-Khalk, in Karachay–Cherkess Autonomous Oblast of the Soviet Union. He finished high school in 1983. Until 1985, he fulfilled his military duty in the province of Arkhangelsk.

In 1985, he graduated from music school with a specialization in classical guitar. In 1989, having created a Nogai music group, they released their first CD called Nogay Keşeler (Nogai Nights). In the same year, he achieved first place at the Bard Festival of Karachay-Cherkess Republic. In 1994, he took the title of Karachay-Cherkess Republic National Artist and "The Most Beautiful Sound of the Republic". He has composed music for the verses of 15th to 17th-century Nogai poets he studied, such as Şal-Kiyiz Tilenşi oğlu, Asan Kaygılı, Kaz-Tuvgan Süyüniş oğlu and Dosmambet Azavlı.

In 1997 in St. Petersburg, he released his second CD, Nogai El (Nogai Homeland), for which Ali Bey Asakayev made the arrangements. Also in 1997, he attended the Turkic Folk Festival in Moscow. One of Arslanbek’s songs won the name of "Song Of The Festival". In 2004, Arslanbek Sultanbekov moved to Astana, capital of Kazakhstan, where he played in the Presidential Orchestra of Kazakhstan. In 2005, he won two awards in the “patriotic song composing competition” organized for the 60th anniversary of the end of World War II. In 2008, he published a CD named Aşşı Su (Bitter Water) in Kazakhstan.

Since 2018, he has been married to film director Karina Satlykova. He has a daughter named Derya.

Discography 
 Nogay Keşeler (1992)
 Nogay El (1998)
 Aşşı Su (2008)
 Osman Bey (2020)
Yalan Dünya

References

External links 
Biography (Turkish): http://www.biyografi.net/kisiayrinti.asp?kisiid=5473
Facebook page: https://www.facebook.com/Asau.Alakay

1965 births
Living people
People from Karachay-Cherkessia
Nogai people
Folk musicians
Dombra players
20th-century Russian musicians
20th-century Russian male musicians
21st-century Russian musicians
21st-century Russian male musicians